Tonioli is a surname of Italian origin. Notable people with the surname include: 

 Bruno Tonioli (born 1955), Italian entertainer
 Marcella Tonioli (born 1986), Italian archer

See also

Antonioli
Toniolo
 
Italian-language surnames